Keller Joseph Chryst (born November 17, 1995) is an American football quarterback who is a free agent. He played college football at the University of Tennessee and Stanford University.

Early years
Chryst attended Weddington High School in Weddington, North Carolina for his freshman year before transferring to Palo Alto High School in Palo Alto, California. During his career he passed for 7,326 yards and 85 touchdowns. Chryst was considered a four-star recruit and ranked among the top quarterbacks in his class. He committed to Stanford University to play college football.

College career

Stanford
Keller Chryst went 11-2 as a starter at Stanford. His 11-2 record, an .846 winning percentage is best in school history.  Chryst also is second all-time in points per game (37.4) to Andrew Luck (42.5).  His touchdown to interception ratio is third all-time behind only Luck and Joe Borchard.  He also set a Stanford school record going six consecutive games without an offensive turnover.  His 62 yard TD run against Rice in 2016 is the longest run for a touchdown by a Stanford QB.

After red-shirting his first year at Stanford in 2014, Chryst appeared in four games as a backup to Kevin Hogan. As the back up to Kevin Hogan, Chryst completed five of nine passes for 59 yards and a touchdown. That 2015 Stanford team beat Iowa in the Rose Bowl and finished third in the nation in the final polls.

In 2016 Chryst took over for Ryan Burns who went 4-3 as the starter.  Chryst won the final six games of the season when the offense averaged 42.5 points and 510 yards per game.  After throwing for a touchdown in the first quarter of the Sun Bowl Chryst tore his ACL.  He recovered in a remarkable 6 months to start the 2017 season opener vs Rice in Australia.  In that game he threw for 253 yards and two touchdowns.

2016 season
Chryst made his debut as the starting quarterback on October 29, throwing for 104 yards and two touchdowns against Arizona. On November 12, Chryst threw three touchdowns and 258 yards in a 52–27 rout against Oregon. The next week, he threw two touchdowns and 198 yards as well as running for another score in a 45–31 win over California at the 119th annual Big Game. At the regular-season finale, Chryst threw for two touchdowns and 154 yards against Rice. He also ran for a 62-yard touchdown, the second longest rushing touchdown of the season for the Cardinal, behind a 90-yard touchdown by Christian McCaffrey against California. It is also the longest touchdown run by a quarterback in Stanford history. In his five starts in the regular season, Chryst went 5–0, throwing nine touchdowns and only one interception, including 774 passing yards.

At the 2016 Sun Bowl, Chryst threw a touchdown and left in the second quarter with a knee injury in a 25–23 win over North Carolina.

2017 season
Chryst started for the 2017 regular-season opener, throwing two touchdowns and 253 yards in a 62–7 rout against Rice.

His best game was against Oregon in Palo Alto when he went 15-21 for 181 yards and threw three touchdowns in the 49-7 win. The previous season in Eugene, he passed for 258 yards and three touchdowns in that 52-27 victory.

The following week, Chryst led a fourth quarter game-winning drive against Oregon State in Corvallis.  He completed a pass to J.J. Arcega-Whiteside on a fade route with 20 seconds left to win the game.  Earlier in that drive he completed a 25 yard pass to Kaden Smith on 4th and 10.

He was voted team captain for Stanford in the 2017 season.

Tennessee
After graduating from Stanford in June, Chryst joined Tennessee as a graduate transfer. He competed for the Volunteers' starting quarterback job with Jarrett Guarantano.

Against #1 ranked Alabama, Chryst replaced Guarantano when he was injured in the quarter quarter. He led the Vols on two consecutive drives that ended in passing touchdowns.

Having only been on campus since June, he won the 2018 Tennessee MY ALL award and was named as a team captain.

Professional leagues

NFL
Following the 2019 NFL Draft, Chryst was invited to both the Indianapolis Colts and Pittsburgh Steelers rookie minicamps. During the 2019 season, both the Buffalo Bills and Seattle Seahawks brought him in for tryouts.

The Spring League
Chryst participated in The Spring League's Denver showcase event on July 17, 2020. He was 10-16 for 142 yards and two touchdowns in The Spring League showcase game.

Chryst was selected by the Aviators of The Spring League during its player selection draft on October 12, 2020. He remained on the Aviators' roster for the 2021 season.

Personal life
Chryst's father Geep was a coach in the National Football League (NFL). His uncle Paul was the head coach of the Wisconsin Badgers from 2015–2022. His brother, Jackson, is a quarterback at Oregon State.

References

External links

 Tennessee Volunteers bio
 Stanford Cardinal bio

Living people
American football quarterbacks
Stanford Cardinal football players
Tennessee Volunteers football players
The Spring League players
People from Weddington, North Carolina
Sportspeople from Palo Alto, California
Players of American football from California
Players of American football from North Carolina
1995 births